Panorpa neglecta is a species of common scorpionfly in the family Panorpidae. It is indigenous to North America.

References

Panorpidae
Articles created by Qbugbot
Insects described in 1931